Lauren Morgan (born April 28, 1993) is an American water skier. She participated at the 2022 World Games in the water skiing competition, where she won the gold medal in the women's jump event.

References 

1993 births
Living people
Place of birth missing (living people)
American water skiers
World Games gold medalists
Competitors at the 2022 World Games
21st-century American women